The Hans and Pat Suter Wildlife Refuge is a wildlife refuge in Corpus Christi, Texas. The Refuge is located on the western shore of Oso Bay, on Ennis Joslin Road, near the Pharaoh Valley subdivision.

Birds
The Refuge is considered to be one of the best sea bird watching areas in the world. The nearby Pharaohs golf course also serves as a haven for coastal and migratory birds.

Some of the birds regularly found in the Refuge are

pelicans
herons
gulls
coots
egrets
spoonbills
and ducks.

Amenities
The Refuge has a pier for viewing the birds and a bike and hiking trail runs through it, meandering by native plants and running along the water. There are also grills and picnic tables in the park area.

See also
Protected area
South Texas

External links
Suter Wildlife Refuge - Corpus Christi, Texas, Waymark

Birdwatching sites in the United States
Landforms of Corpus Christi, Texas
Protected areas of Nueces County, Texas
Nature reserves in Texas
Wetlands of Texas
Wildlife sanctuaries of the United States
Bird sanctuaries of the United States
Tourist attractions in Corpus Christi, Texas
Landforms of Nueces County, Texas